Evidentification – formal proof the fact /  process of confirmation / evidencing of certain information, action or fact.

References

Sources of knowledge
Evidence